Marchetti is an Italian surname. Notable people with the surname include:

Alberto Marchetti (born 1954), Italian professional football player
Alessandro Marchetti (aircraft engineer) (1884–1966), Italian aircraft engineer
Alessandro Marchetti (mathematician) (1633–1714), Italian mathematician
Alessandro Marchetti (footballer) (born 1988), Italian footballer 
Angelo Marchetti (1674-1753), Italian astronomer from Pistoia
Assunta Marchetti (1871–1948), Italian beatified of the Catholic Church
M. Cristina Marchetti (born 1955), Italian-American physicist
Elio Marchetti (born 1974), Italian race car driver and motorcycle racer
Enrico Marchetti (1855-1930), Italian violin maker
Federico Marchetti (born 1983), Italian international football goalkeeper
Federico Marchetti (businessman) (born 1969), founder of YOOX 
Fermo Dante Marchetti (1876-1940), Italian composer and songwriter
Filippo Marchetti (1831–1902), Italian opera composer
Gianluca Marchetti (born 1993),  Italian professional basketball player 
Gianni Marchetti (1933-2012),  Italian composer songwriter
Gianpietro Marchetti (born 1948), Italian professional footballer 
Gino Marchetti (1927–2019), American professional football player
Giorgia Marchetti (born 1995), Italian tennis player
Giovanni Battista Marchetti (1730-1800),  Italian decorative fresco painter in a neoclassical-style
Giovanni Matteo Marchetti (1647-1704), Bishop of Arezzo
Giovanni Marchetti (ice hockey) (born 1968), Italian ice hockey player
Giulio Marchetti (1911-1993), Italian stage, film and television actor and presenter
John W. Marchetti (1908-2003), American radar pioneer
Leandro Marchetti (born 1974), Argentine fencer
Louis Marchetti (1920–1992), Italian illustrator and portrait painter
Marco Marchetti (1528–1588), Italian painter of the late-Renaissance or Mannerist period
Maria Cristina Marchetti born 1955), Italian-born American theoretical physicist 
Michele Marchetti (born 1994), Italian ice hockey player 
Nino Marchetti (1909-1983), Italian film actor
Piero Marchetti, Italian bobsledder
Raffaele Marchetti (born 1975), Italian political scientist and editorialist
Stefano Marchetti (ice hockey), Italian professional ice hockey defenceman
Stefano Marchetti (footballer, born 1963),  Italian former football striker.
Stefano Marchetti (footballer, born 1998), Italian football player
Victor Marchetti (1930-2018), American writer, executive assistant to the Deputy Director of the Central Intelligence Agency
Vincent Marchetti (born 1997), French professional footballer

See also
22155 Marchetti, main-belt asteroid
Savoia-Marchetti, Italian aircraft manufacturer
Louis Marchetti House, located in Wausau, Wisconsin, United States
Marchetti Glacier, in the Saint Johns Range of Victoria Land, Antarctic
Palazzo Marchetti, Pistoia, Baroque-style palace located in central Pistoia, Tuscany, Italy

Italian-language surnames